Matthäus Donner (1704–1756) was an Austrian sculptor known for his relief carvings and medals.

References

1704 births
1756 deaths
Austrian sculptors
Austrian male sculptors